Contextual deep linking is a form of deep linking for mobile apps that links to specific content within an app, rather than a generic welcome screen for that app. Where basic mobile deep linking typically only allows you to deep link to content in apps you’ve already downloaded, contextual deep linking allows you to pass information through the app store. Referring information is passed through both the App Store (iOS) and Google Play, bringing the user to the content of the links within the app whether or not the app has been previously installed.

References

URL
Online advertising